The 1999 Richmondshire District Council election took place on 6 May 1999 to elect members of Richmondshire District Council in North Yorkshire, England. The whole council was up for election and independents lost overall control of the council to no overall control.

Election result
Overall turnout at the election was 40.22%, down from 44.59% in 1995.

Ward results

By-elections between 1999 and 2003

Colburn
A by-election was held in Colburn on 9 September 1999 after the resignation of independent councillor John Lacey. The seat was won by independent candidate Peter Wood with a majority of 49 votes over Hospital Campaign candidate Peter Fowler.

St Michael with St Luke
A by-election was held in St Michael with St Luke on 22 February 2001 after the death of independent councillor William Corps. The seat was won by independent candidate Kenneth Smith with a majority of 36 votes over Conservative Michael Godwin.

Middleham and Coverdale
A by-election was held in Middleham and Coverdale on 7 June 2001 after the resignation of Conservative councillor Andrea Robson. The seat was held for the Conservatives by Derek Jarvill with a majority of 373 votes over Liberal Democrat John Weedon.

Catterick with Tunstall
A by-election was held in Catterick with Tunstall on 30 August 2001 after the resignation of Social Democrat councillor Brian Smith. The seat was gained for the Liberal Democrats by Patrick Brennan with a majority of 41 votes over Conservative Melva Steckles.

Leyburn
A by-election was held in Leyburn on 25 October 2001 after the resignation of Liberal Democrat councillor Thomas Forth. The seat was gained for the Conservatives by Wendy Morton with a majority of 4 votes over Liberal Democrat John Weedon after a recount.

References

1999
1999 English local elections
1990s in North Yorkshire